Sydney Harbour Patrol is an Australian factual television show that follows marine police, salvage teams, ship yards and environmental protection units in Sydney, Australia. The series is produced by WTFN and screened on the Foxtel Discovery Channel.

References

External links
 

Australian factual television series
2016 Australian television series debuts
English-language television shows
Television shows set in Sydney